Allegiance: War of Factions is an out-of-print social and political collectible card game set in a medieval city-state undergoing political turmoil due to the death of its king. It was created by Andrew Grierson and published by Lucid Raven Productions in 2004.

Game summary
Two or more players attempt to gain the support of influential individuals within the city in order to assume the throne. Players can alternatively mount armies and eliminate opponents militarily. Defenses are also necessary due to a card type called Wanderers, randomly controlled elements (usually in the guise of monsters) that occasionally attack players. If at any point during the game the wanderers equal more than three times the number of players, all players immediately lose the game.

In order to win the game through influence, a player must start a round with Victory Influence equal to or greater than the amount agreed on before the game (normally 25). This Influence usually comes from personalities, but can come from other sources as well.

Play sequence
Allegiance uses rounds instead of turns, meaning that all players perform the same phase before moving on to the next. A full round consist of five phases, defined as follows:

 City Maintenance Phase – Immediately upon beginning this phase, a check for victory is performed to see if any players have reached the target amount of Victory Influence. Next, the player with the most influence tokens is declared the Lead Player for that round. Finally, players draw until they hold seven cards in their hand, ready all cards and can move cards around between certain areas of the game.
 Action and Development Phase – Beginning with the Lead Player, players take turns performing a single action. Actions include playing one card from the player's hand, or using one ability of one card in play. When all players have passed consecutively, the phase ends.
 Military Phase – Beginning with the Lead Player, each player may declare one military attack, either against another player or against any or all Wanderers in one player's play area.
 Wanderer Phase – Beginning with the Lead Player, an Aggression Check must be made for all wanderers. This is done by rolling a die for each and comparing it to the Agronssion printed on the card, with a die roll that is equal to or higher causing the wanderer to attack a random player. Once this is done, a new wanderer is brought into play by the active player. The next player clockwise then performs this phase, and the phase ends when all players have done so.
 Discard Phase – Players may optionally discard up to three cards of their choice.

Card types
 Personalities – Personalities are troops and citizens that ultimately lead a player to victory. They can be unique, named personalities (e.g. Feronant Domar) or generic unnamed personalities (e.g. Footman). There can only be one instance of any unique personality in play at any given time; this limitation does not affect generic personalities.
 Events – One-time events which have an immediate effect on the game.
 Items – Items such as swords, shields, and potions that can be given to any personality that a player controls.
 Invocations – Divine miracles that take the place of magic, invocations give a religious-based personality additional powers.
 Structures – Structures generally fall into two types: defensive structures such as walls and production structures that help players gather resources to play cards. A special type of structure exists called a Stronghold, which the player begins play with. If a Stronghold is destroyed through any means, that player is removed from the game.
 Wanderers – Wanderers are a rogue element that players must automatically put into play each turn. Wanderers have an aggression rating, and occasionally will attack. It is not uncommon to have a wanderer attack the player who put it into play.

Unique aspects
Allegiance uses a number of concepts and gameplay mechanics that make it quite different from other collectible and trading card games on the market. These include:

 Multiple Decks – Each player has three decks: a Personality Deck (which also contains Events, Items, and Invocations), a Structure Deck, and a Wanderer Deck. When a player is asked to draw a card, the card may be drawn from either the Personality or Structure Deck, letting the player choose the type of card that will be most beneficial to the game. The Wanderer Deck is not drawn from except during the Wanderer Phase, and that card is immediately put into play.
 Limited Resources – The resources in the game, called Influence tokens, are physical items that are limited to 12 per player (4 gold Economic Influence, 4 blue Religious Influence, and 4 black Political Influence). All tokens that are played go into a shared City Influence Pool, and whenever resources are generated tokens are taken from this shared pool. If no tokens of a specific type exist in the pool, then the resource is temporarily not available.
 Trading and Negotiations – The Allegiance rules specify that deals and trades may take place in the game provided that the terms are made public. This often includes non-aggression pacts, the lending of troops, or resource exchanges. Additionally, if all players agree beforehand, cards in play may be traded during the City Maintenance Phase.
 All Players Can Lose – If Wanderers are not occasionally hunted and removed from play, they can overrun the city and cause all players to lose.
 Action-Based Play – In addition to the use of turns, players may only take a single action at a time. This means that unlike many other CCGs, a player may not gather resources and play a card immediately afterwards. This, combined with the limited resources in the game, forces players to consider each move carefully. Additionally, this means that there are very few actions that interrupt play or cancel opponent's actions (such as "counter-spells" that exist in other games).
 Beginning Resources – Each player begins with all 12 of the influence tokens that are being contributed to the game, and can use those tokens to purchase and play structures from the Structure Deck. This allows players to make sure that sufficient resources or defensive structures are present before the game even starts.
 Use of rounds instead of turns – This mechanic is not unique to Allegiance, but shows up very rarely in CCGs. Other instances include such games as Doomtown, Legend of the Burning Sands, Battlestar Galactica CCG.

Additionally, the game was designed for multi-player play, a rarity in the CCG world. Games also last an average of an hour to an hour and a half, which is more similar to a board game than other CCGs.

Deck composition
Each player's Personality and Structure decks must contain at least 15 cards each, with no more than two of any one card. The 15 card minimum for Structure Decks is after players have chosen what cards they will begin play with, effectively making the minimum 16 (as each player must begin play with a Stronghold). The Wanderer Deck must contain 3 Wanderers per player. There is no upper limit to any of the decks, though players may not play with more than one Stronghold card in their deck.

Additionally, players may have cards from up to three factions in their decks: one political faction, one economic/military faction, and one religious faction.

Products
Cards are available both in a one-player starter set and in booster packs.  The starter set includes 55 cards (4 rares, 10 uncommons, 30 commons, and 11 fixed commons), 20 gems, 1 die, and a rule sheet. Booster packs include 12 cardsincluding 1 rare, 2 uncommons, and 9 commons, including 10 which are exclusive to the starter. An expansion set, titled The Undercity, was originally scheduled for release in 2005 in a booster-only format, but has not been released yet.

Factions
Currently, there are three fully playable factions, with a fourth set to become playable in the first expansion:
 The Glory of Kalim (religious faction)
 House Mosfin (political faction)
 The Veteran's Guild (economic/military faction)
 Guild Darkmoor (economic/military faction to be released in The Undercity)

Guild Darkmoor was also featured on one promo card released by Lucid Raven. Two additional factions have been seen on promo cards, but have not been identified.

Award nominations
Allegiance was nominated for Best Collectible Card Game or Expansion, as well as the People's Choice Award in the Origins Awards in 2005.

External links
Allegiance: War of Factions Collectible Card Game Website
Lucid Raven Productions Website

Card games introduced in 2004
Collectible card games